is a Japanese professional shogi player ranked 7-dan.

Early life
Kawakami was born on July 12, 1972, in Adachi, Tokyo. Promoted to apprentice professional 1-dan in 1990, he full professional status and the rank of 4-dan in 1993 after winning the 12th 3-dan League (October 1992March 1993) with a record of 15 wins and 3 losses.

Shogi professional
Kawakami finished runner-up to Torahiko Tanaka in the 3rd  in 1994, but the tournament was not yet considered to be an official tournament at the time.

In 2013, he finished the finished the 71st Meijin Class C2 league (April 2012March 2013) with a record of 2 wins and 8 losses, earning a third demotion point which meant automatic demotion to "Free Class" play.

Promotion history
The promotion history for Kawakami is as follows:
 6-kyū: 1987
 1-dan: 1990
 4-dan: April 1, 1993
 5-dan: June 3, 1999
 6-dan: September 20, 2005
 7-dan: October 17, 2017

References

External links
ShogiHub: Professional Player Info · Kawakami, Takeshi

Japanese shogi players
Living people
Professional shogi players
Professional shogi players from Tokyo
1972 births
Free class shogi players
People from Adachi, Tokyo